Although the European portion of France is part of the Schengen Area, its overseas departments, collectivities and other territories apply their own visa policies, which have some additional exemptions or restrictions compared to the visa policy of the Schengen Area.

Visa exemptions

Unlimited period
Nationals of the following countries can enter and reside for an unlimited period without a visa in Overseas France. They may use their national identity card instead of their passport as a travel document to enter any French territory. They may also work freely in the parts of Overseas France that are part of the European Union (overseas departments and regions, and Saint Martin), but those who are not nationals of France need a permit to work in other parts such as French Polynesia, New Caledonia, and Wallis and Futuna.

Short stays
For stays of up to 90 days in a 180-day period, visa-free entry is granted to nationals of the following countries and territories (except as otherwise noted):

This exemption also applies to:
 Holders of a long-stay visa or residence permit issued by France or another Schengen Area country
 Nationals of the following countries holding a multiple-entry visa issued by France with validity between 6 months and 5 years:

{|style="border-radius:1em; box-shadow: 0.1em 0.1em 0.5em rgba(0,0,0,0.75); background-color: white; border: 1px solid white; padding: 5px"
|style=width:30em|
|}

Additional exemptions for specific territories
For specific territories, nationals of the following countries are also granted visa-free stays of up to 90 days in a 180-day period (except as otherwise noted).

For French Guiana, Guadeloupe and Martinique:

For Saint Martin:

For Saint Pierre and Miquelon:

For Mayotte:

For Réunion:

For New Caledonia, Wallis and Futuna, and French Polynesia:

Summary of short-stay visa exemptions

Obtaining a visa
Foreign nationals who need a visa for a part of Overseas France can obtain one by lodging an application at a French embassy or consulate in their country of residence (or, in the case of foreign nationals already in a part of France, the local prefecture) for a fee of up to €99 (depending on the destination, length of stay, age and nationality).

Schengen short-stay visas are not valid for Overseas France (except for nationals of certain countries as listed above), and vice versa. A visa with the designation "départements français d'Amérique" (DFA) allows visiting all parts of Overseas France in the Americas (French Guiana, Guadeloupe, Martinique, Saint Barthélemy, Saint Martin, and Saint Pierre and Miquelon). A visa with the designation "valable pour France sauf CTOM" allows visiting all parts of Overseas France in the Americas as well as Réunion.

Visitor statistics

See also

Visa policy of the Schengen Area
Visa policy of the Kingdom of the Netherlands in the Caribbean

Notes

References

Overseas France
Overseas France
Foreign relations of France